Homo Academicus is a South Korean documentary television program broadcast by Korean Broadcasting System (KBS). It is narrated by Yoo Seung-ho, and hosted by Lilli Margolin, Scott Yim, Jenny Martin, and Bryan Kauder.

Premise
The program features four Harvard University students who travel the world visiting culturally historic areas and places of learning. The correspondents interview students and parents in an effort to show contemporary methods of and motivations for studying, and to place traditions, conversations, and landmarks in an historical context. The program depicts how cultural differences, privileges, and inequities affect education and styles of learning. It is hosted in English and narrated in Korean, with subtitles for each language. Countries covered by the show's correspondents include China, France, India, Israel, Japan, South Korea, Uganda, and the United States. Partnership with BBC on which to be shown internationally is in the works.

Overview

Episode 1 
Theme: The Old Desire (오래된 욕망)
Air date: February 28, 2013

Episode 2 
Theme: Descendants of Confucius (공자의 후예)
Air date: March 7, 2013

Episode 3  
Theme: Questions and Memorizing (질문과 암기)
Air date: March 14, 2013

Episode 4  
Theme: The Best Study (최고의 공부)
Air date: March 21, 2013

Episode 5 
Theme: Speaking of Studying Again (다시 공부를 말하다)
Air date: March 28, 2013

DVD releases
Season One

References

External links 
 Homo Academicus - Official Website 

2010s documentary television series
2013 South Korean television series debuts